David Márquez Laguna (born October 13, 1977, in Barcelona, Catalonia) is a retired male race walker from Spain.

Achievements

External links

sports-reference

1977 births
Living people
Spanish male racewalkers
Athletes from Catalonia
Athletes (track and field) at the 2000 Summer Olympics
Olympic athletes of Spain